Melodi Grand Prix 2020 was the 58th edition of the Norwegian music competition Melodi Grand Prix (MGP) and served as the country's preselection for the Eurovision Song Contest 2020. The competition was organized by NRK between 11 January 2020 and 15 February 2020, and a total of 25 songs participated – the highest number in the history of the competition. 

To celebrate the 60th anniversary of Norway's debut in the Eurovision Song Contest, five heats and a final were organised instead of a single final. Each region in Norway was assigned its own heat, in which four acts from that region competed for a spot in the final on 15 February 2020. In addition, five pre-qualified finalists had been selected by the broadcaster. The heats were held in the H3 Arena in Fornebu, while the final took place in Trondheim Spektrum. This was the first time Trondheim hosted a Melodi Grand Prix final, and also the first time since 1989 that the final was not held in Oslo.

Kåre Magnus Bergh hosted Melodi Grand Prix for the sixth time, while Ronny Brede Aase and Ingrid Gjessing Linhave debuted as presenters of the competition. In the final, the pre-qualified entry "Attention" by Ulrikke Brandstorp received the most votes and was selected to represent Norway in the Eurovision Song Contest 2020 in Rotterdam, Netherlands, before it was cancelled on 18 March 2020 due to the COVID-19 pandemic.

Format

Song submissions 
As in previous years, NRK had invited Norwegian and foreign musicians to submit songs for the competition. Registration for Melodi Grand Prix 2020 opened on 2 March 2019, with the deadline being 31 July of the same year. Each submission had to have at least one Norwegian songwriter, and each songwriter could submit a maximum of three contributions. These changes to the rules led to a significant decrease in the number of songs submitted. In total, the broadcaster received about 800 submissions, compared to about 1,000 in previous years. A total of 25 songs were selected to participate in the competition: 20 songs were divided over the five heats, and five songs qualified directly for the final.

Shows 
2020 marked the 60th anniversary of Norway's debut in the Eurovision Song Contest 1960 with the song "Voi Voi" by Nora Brockstedt. On the occasion of the anniversary, NRK decided to expand the competition with five heats. This is the first time since 2014 that NRK organised heats ahead of the finals.

Each of the five heats was centered around one of Norway's geographical regions: Northern, Central, Western, Southern and Eastern Norway. Four acts from each of these regions competed in their respective heats for a spot in the final on 15 February. The heats were broadcast directly from the H3 Arena in Fornebu, while the final was hosted by Trondheim Spektrum. This was the third time a Melodi Grand Prix final had been held outside of Oslo, and the first time since 1989. It was also the first time that Trondheim hosted the final.

The competition was hosted by three presenters. Kåre Magnus Bergh hosted for the sixth time, whereas Ronny Brede Aase and Ingrid Gjessing Linhave hosted the show for the first time.

Voting 
The audience could vote for the competing acts in each heat, with the act that received most votes after two rounds proceeding to the final. A jury led by Stig Karlsen, the Norwegian head of delegation for the Eurovision Song Contest, selected the five pre-qualified finalists. In each heat, one of the pre-qualified finalists performed to ensure equal broadcasting time for all ten finalists. Viewers could only vote through the broadcaster's website nrk.no.

In the final, the same method of online voting was used to determine the winner of the competition. Due to excessive server load caused by the emoji reaction function of the app, the four gold finalists were determined by a thirty-member backup demoscopic panel as the NRK website was down.

Competing entries 
The competing acts were announced during a press conference in Oslo on 6 January.

Heats

Heat 1 – Southern Norway 
The first heat took place on 11 January 2020 at the H3 Arena in Fornebu.

Heat 2 – Eastern Norway 
The second heat took place on 18 January 2020 at the H3 Arena in Fornebu.

Heat 3 – Central Norway 
The third heat took place on 25 January 2020 at the H3 Arena in Fornebu.

Heat 4 – Western Norway 
The fourth heat took place on 1 February 2020 at the H3 Arena in Fornebu.

Heat 5 – Northern Norway 
The fifth heat took place on 8 February 2020 at the H3 Arena in Fornebu.

Final 
Ten songs consisting of the five heat winners alongside the five pre-qualified songs competed in the final which was hosted by Trondheim Spektrum in Trondheim on 15 February 2020. The running order for the final was announced on 10 February 2020. In the first round, all ten finalists performed once, after which the four best songs proceeded to the gold final. After a second voting round, the two best songs from the gold final proceeded to the gold duel. A third voting round then determined the winner of Melodi Grand Prix 2020.

After the gold duel, the results of the online voting were revealed by representatives of Norway's five regions, which led to the victory of "Attention" performed by Ulrikke Brandstorp.

Spokespersons 
 Southern Norway – Tom Hugo (winner MGP 2019, as part of Keiino)
 Central Norway – Margaret Berger (winner MGP 2013)
 Northern Norway – Agnete Johnsen (winner MGP 2016)
 Western Norway – Bjørn Johan Muri (fourth place MGP 2010)
 Eastern Norway – Åge Sten Nilsen (winner MGP 2005, as part of Wig Wam)

Ratings

See also 
 Norway in the Eurovision Song Contest
 Norway in the Eurovision Song Contest 2020
 Eurovision Song Contest 2020

References 

2020
2020 song contests
January 2020 events in Norway
Eurovision Song Contest 2020
February 2020 events in Norway
Events in Trondheim